Neritilia is a genus of freshwater snails which live near the sea coast in submarine caves. They have an operculum, and are aquatic gastropod mollusks in the family Neritiliidae.

Species
Species within the genus Neritilia include:
 Neritilia abeli Espinosa, Ortea & Diez-García, 2017 
 †Neritilia bisinuata Lozouet, 2004  
  Neritilia cavernicola Kano & Kase, 2004 
  Neritilia hawaiiensis Kay, 1979 - anchialine pool snail
 †Neritilia lawsoni Symonds & Tracey, 2014  
 Neritilia littoralis Kano, Kase & Kubo, 2003
 Neritilia manoeli (Dohrn, 1866)
 Neritilia margaritae Pérez-Dionis, Espinosa & Ortea, 2010 
 Neritilia mariaella Espinosa & Ortea, 2018
 Neritilia mimotoi Kano, Sasaki & Ishikawa, 2001
 † Neritilia neritinoides (Cossmann & Peyrot, 1918)  
 Neritilia panamensis Morrison, 1946
 Neritilia pusilla (C.B. Adams, 1850)
 Neritilia rubida (Pease, 1865) - type species
Neritilia serrana Espinosa, Ortea & Diez-García, 2017 
 Neritilia succinea (Récluz, 1841)
 Neritilia vulgaris Kano & Kase, 2003

Species brought into synonymy
 Neritilia consimilis Martens, 1897: synonym of Neritilia rubida (Pease, 1865) (junior synonym)
 Neritilia traceyi Ladd, 1965: synonym of Laddia traceyi (Ladd, 1965)

References

 Eichhorst T.E. (2016). Neritidae of the world. Volume 2. Harxheim: Conchbooks. Pp. 696-1366

External links
 Martens, E. von. (1863-1879). Die Gattung Neritina. In: Küster, H. C.; Kobelt, W., Weinkauff, H. C., Eds. Systematisches Conchylien-Cabinet von Martini und Chemnitz. Neu herausgegeben und vervollständigt. Zweiten Bandes zehnte Abtheilung. 1-303, pls A, 1-23. Nürnberg: Bauer & Raspe
 Adams, A. (1863). On some new genera and species of Umboniidae from the seas of Japan. Annals and Magazine of Natural History. (3) 11: 264-268
 Iredale, T. (1918). Molluscan nomenclatural problems and solutions.- No. 1. Proceedings of the Malacological Society of London. 13(1-2): 28-40
 Kano Y. & Kase T. (2003). Systematics of the Neritilia rubida complex (Gastropoda: Neritiliidae): three amphidromous species with overlapping distributions in the Indo-Pacific. Journal of Molluscan Studies. 69(3): 273-284.

Neritiliidae
Taxa named by Eduard von Martens
Gastropod genera
Taxonomy articles created by Polbot